The 1939 Palestine Cup (HaGavia HaEretz-Israeli) was the tenth season of Israeli Football Association's nationwide football cup competition.

The defending holders, Hapoel Tel Aviv, won the cup for the third time in a row, beating Maccabi Avshalom Petah Tikva 2–1 in the Maccabiah Stadium.

Results

First round

Quarter-finals

Bye: Hapoel Tel Aviv

Replay

Semi-finals

Final

References
100 Years of Football 1906-2006, Elisha Shohat (Israel), 2006

External links
 Israel Football Association website 

Israel State Cup
Cup
Israel State Cup seasons